The 1999 Scottish Claymores season was the fifth season for the franchise in the NFL Europe League (NFLEL). The team was led by head coach Jim Criner in his fifth year, and played its home games at Murrayfield Stadium in Edinburgh (three) and Hampden Park in Glasgow, Scotland (two). They finished the regular season in fifth place with a record of four wins and six losses.

Personnel

Staff

Roster

Schedule

Standings

Game summaries

Week 9: vs Amsterdam Admirals

Week 10: at Amsterdam Admirals

Notes

References

Scottish Claymores seasons